Ravenna is a historic two-and-a-half-story mansion in Natchez, Mississippi, U.S.. It was built in 1835-1836 for William Harris, a merchant commissioner, planter and Natchez alderman. It was designed in the Greek Revival architectural style, based on plans by Asher Benjamin. By the 1850s, it was purchased by the Metcalfe family, whose descendants owned the house until they sold it to Dr. Mallan Morgan in the 1980s. It has been listed on the National Register of Historic Places since November 4, 1982.

Ravenna's address has been given as 8 Ravenna Lane and as 601 South Union Street.  It is one of three houses which were originally part of a family compound, along with Ravenna Cottage at 4 Ravenna Lane and Ravennaside (c.1900) also at 601 South Union Street.  All three are included in the 1999-listed Downriver Residential Historic District.

References

Houses on the National Register of Historic Places in Mississippi
Greek Revival architecture in Mississippi
Houses completed in 1836
Houses in Natchez, Mississippi
Individually listed contributing properties to historic districts on the National Register in Mississippi
1836 establishments in Mississippi